Jataí Atlético Clube, commonly known as Jataí, is a Brazilian football club based in Jataí, Goiás state.

History
The club was founded on November 24, 1997.

Stadium
Jataí Atlético Clube play their home games at Estádio Ronan Maia. The stadium has a maximum capacity of 4,000 people.

References

Association football clubs established in 1997
Football clubs in Goiás
1997 establishments in Brazil